= Kodi, Bhopal =

Kodi
- village
- Location within Madhya Pradesh Location within India
- Coordinates: 23.121422°N 77.464892°E
- Country: India
- State: Madhya Pradesh
- District: Bhopal
- Tehsil: Huzur

Population (2011)
  - Total: 221
- Time zone: UTC+5:30 (IST)
- ISO 3166 code: MP-IN
- Census code: 482532

Kodi is a village in the Bhopal district of Madhya Pradesh, India. It is located in the Huzur tehsil and the Phanda block.

== Demographics ==
According to the 2011 census of India, Kodi has 45 households. The literacy rate of the village is 66.97%.

Demographics (2011 Census)
| | Total | Male | Female |
|---|---|---|---|
| Population | 221 | 110 | 111 |
| Children aged below 6 years | 31 | 17 | 14 |
| Scheduled caste | 25 | 12 | 13 |
| Scheduled tribe | 6 | 4 | 2 |
| Literates | 148 | 78 | 70 |
| Workers (all) | 70 | 54 | 16 |
| Main workers (total) | 49 | 43 | 6 |
| Main workers: Cultivators | 23 | 21 | 2 |
| Main workers: Agricultural labourers | 15 | 11 | 4 |
| Main workers: Household industry workers | 0 | 0 | 0 |
| Main workers: Other | 11 | 11 | 0 |
| Marginal workers (total) | 21 | 11 | 10 |
| Marginal workers: Cultivators | 9 | 6 | 3 |
| Marginal workers: Agricultural labourers | 11 | 4 | 7 |
| Marginal workers: Household industry workers | 0 | 0 | 0 |
| Marginal workers: Others | 1 | 1 | 0 |
| Non-workers | 151 | 56 | 95 |
